Oleg Syrokvashko (3 August 1961 – 16 July 2016) was a Belarusian professional football coach and a former player. He spent the majority of his playing and coaching career at Dinamo Brest. He died at the age of 54 after a long-term illness.

References

External links
 

1961 births
2016 deaths
Footballers from Minsk
Soviet footballers
Belarusian footballers
Belarusian expatriate footballers
Expatriate footballers in Poland
Expatriate footballers in Uzbekistan
Belarusian expatriate sportspeople in Poland
Belarusian expatriate sportspeople in Uzbekistan
Belarusian football managers
FC Dynamo Brest players
FC Dinamo Minsk players
FC Torpedo Minsk players
NK Veres Rivne players
Victoria Jaworzno players
Navbahor Namangan players
FC Kobrin players
FC Dynamo Brest managers
Association football goalkeepers